Indonesia's languages have different writing systems.

Writing systems

See also 
 Languages of Indonesia

References